Marie Šedivá (12 October 1908 – 13 December 1975) was a Czech fencer. She competed in the women's individual foil event at the 1936 Summer Olympics.

References

1908 births
1975 deaths
Czech female foil fencers
Czechoslovak female foil fencers
Olympic fencers of Czechoslovakia
Fencers at the 1936 Summer Olympics